Oof is an album by the punk rock band Happy Flowers. It was released in 1989.

Track listing
"Stop Touching My Food"
"Unhappy Meal"
ppop

"There's a Soft Spot on the Baby's Head"
"Finger in My Crackerjacks"
"Ain't Got Nothin'"
"I Said I Wanna Watch Cartoons"
"My Arm Won't Wake Up"
"My Evil Twin"
"I'm Gonna Have an Accident"
"Let's Eat the Baby (Like My Gerbils Did)"
"BB Gun"
"Let Me Out"
"I Don't Wanna Go to School"
"Mrs. Lennon"

Personnel
 John Beers ("Mr. Horribly Charred Infant") — vocals
 Charlie Kramer ("Mr. Anus") — guitar

References

Happy Flowers albums
1989 albums